An election of Members of the European Parliament from Hungary to the European Parliament was held in 2009. Hungary delegated 22 members to the European Parliament based on the Nice treaty and the election took place on 7 June.

Candidates
Among the candidates that ran were:
Pál Schmitt, József Szájer, Kinga Gál, János Áder, László Surján, Lívia Járóka, András Gyürk, Béla Glattfelder, Ádám Kósa, Ágnes Hankiss for Fidesz – Hungarian Civic Union
Kinga Göncz, Edit Herczog, Zita Gurmai, Csaba Sándor Tabajdi, Gyula Hegyi, Szabolcs Fazekas, Gyula Cserei, Mihály Kökény, Gábor Harangozó for the Hungarian Socialist Party 
Lajos Bokros, György Habsburg, Szabolcs Joó, Ibolya Dávid for the Hungarian Democratic Forum
 István Szent-Iványi, Gabriella Béki, Gábor Demszky, György Konrád for the Alliance of Free Democrats
 Krisztina Morvai, Zoltán Balczó, Csanád Szegedi, Judit Szima, Gábor Vona for Jobbik – Movement for a Better Hungary

Election
The election in Hungary took place according to the 2003 CXIII. law about European election and the 1997 C. election law. According to this the country consists of a single election district and those parties will be put on the ballot who could collect 20,000 proposal coupons. Eight qualified lists were approved by Hungarian authorities to be put on the ballot, of which two of them were shared lists. Fidesz shared its party list with the Christian Democratic People's Party (KDNP) to create a joint Fidesz-KDNP list, and Politics Can Be Different shared its party list with the Humanist Party to create a joint LMP-HP list.

Opinion polls

Results 
The European Parliament elections' biggest winners were the centre-right opposition Fidesz party, which won 56% of the vote and 14 seats. The far-right Jobbik ("For a Better Hungary") party also performed stronger than expected. The Hungarian Democratic Forum also gained one seat, so the former finance minister Lajos Bokros could travel to Brussels.

The liberal Alliance of Free Democrats (SZDSZ) was almost wiped off the political map, attracting only 60,000 votes or 2%, compared to more than a million in the country's first free elections 19 years ago.

By county

List of seat winners

On the Fidesz Party list:
Pál Schmitt
József Szájer
Kinga Gál
János Áder
László Surján
Tamás Deutsch
Lívia Járóka
György Schöpflin
András Gyürk
Csaba Őry
Béla Glattfelder
Ádám Kósa
Ágnes Hankiss
Enikő Győri

On the Hungarian Socialist Party list:
Kinga Göncz
Edit Herczog
Zita Gurmai
Csaba Tabajdi
On the Jobbik Party list:
Krisztina Morvai
Zoltán Balczó
Csanád Szegedi
On the Hungarian Democratic Forum Party list:
Lajos Bokros

Consequences
Alliance of Free Democrats Party leader Gábor Fodor announced that he will offer his resignation in case his party will not reach the 5% limit needed for representation in the European Parliament (the same limit is applied in national elections). After the election results were published Fodor repeated his statement promising to offer his resignation to the party congress the following day. The election result ultimately caused mass resignations including Fodor in the leadership of SZDSZ and internal turmoil in the party. The election results prompted an intense debate about the future of the party in MSZP as well.

See also
List of political parties in Hungary
MEPs for Hungary 2004–09
MEPs for Hungary 2009–14

References

Hungary
2009
2009 in Hungary